Jason F. Wright (born February 1, 1971, in Florissant, Missouri) is an American author, actor, and speaker.

Biography
Jason F. Wright was born on February 1 near St. Louis, Missouri to Willard Samuel Wright and Sandra Fletcher Wright. His family lived and traveled throughout Europe until 1975. He later lived in Chicago, Illinois and Charlottesville, Virginia. He began writing in elementary school and published this first book, Sitting on the Dock, as a junior in high school in 1988.

His 2007 novel, The Wednesday Letters, reached #6 on The New York Times bestseller list. It also appeared on the bestseller lists of The Wall Street Journal and USA Today. The paperback edition, published by Penguin, was on The New York Times trade paperback bestseller and extended lists for 36 weeks in 2008–2009. A film adaptation is in development.

His 2005 novel, Christmas Jars, was also a New York Times bestseller, appearing on the paperback list in 2007. The film was produced by Muse and BYUtv and was released in theaters in November 2019. It was later released on DVD and on streaming platforms.

His debut novel, The James Miracle, was first released in 2004. A 10-year anniversary edition was released in October 2014.

In addition to his novels, Jason writes occasionally for the Deseret News, Fox News and his hometown paper, the Northern Virginia Daily. His columns have also appeared in more than 50 newspapers and magazines across the United States including The Washington Times, The Chicago Tribune, and Forbes.

More than a writer, Jason also speaks around the country in schools, at conventions and corporate events, and in churches of every kind.

He and his family are active members of the Church of Jesus Christ of Latter-day Saints. He served a volunteer mission in Belo Horizonte, Brazil from 1990 to 1992.

Works

 See Love Lift: How Seeing, Loving, and Lifting Others Will Change Your Life (2020)
 The Christmas Doll (2019)
 Courage to Be You, with Gail Miller (2018)
 Christmas Jars: Collector's Edition (2017)
 Picturing Christmas (2017)
 A Letter to Mary (2016)
 Christmas Jars Journey (2015)
 The James Miracle: 10th Anniversary Edition (2014)
 The 13th Day of Christmas (2012)
 The Wedding Letters (2011)
 Seventeen Second Miracle (2010)
 The Cross Gardener (2010)
 Christmas Jars Reunion (2009)
 Penny's Christmas Jar Miracle (2009)
 Recovering Charles (2008)
 The Wednesday Letters (2007)
 Christmas Jars (2005)
 The James Miracle'' (2004)

References

External links
 

1971 births
21st-century American novelists
American Latter Day Saint writers
American male novelists
Living people
American Mormon missionaries in Brazil
People from Shenandoah County, Virginia
Novelists from Virginia
20th-century Mormon missionaries
People from Florissant, Missouri
Novelists from Missouri
21st-century American male writers
Latter Day Saints from Missouri
Latter Day Saints from Illinois
Latter Day Saints from Virginia
People from Charlottesville, Virginia
21st-century American non-fiction writers
American male non-fiction writers
American male film actors